The 2020 New York Lizards season was the 20th and final season for the Lizards in Major League Lacrosse. The Lizards were coming off of a 5-11 record in the 2019 season in which they missed the playoffs, where they finished in last place in the standings. However, the Lizards would finish with an 0-5 record, becoming the second team in MLL history to finish a season winless, joining the 2006 Chicago Machine where they went 0-12.

Shortened season

Originally slated to play a ten-game regular season that was originally scheduled to begin play on May 30, Major League Lacrosse suspended the season until July 18 due to the COVID–19 pandemic. The season was then rescheduled as a five–game regular season with all games including the postseason being played at Navy–Marine Corps Memorial Stadium, home of the Chesapeake Bayhawks.

Schedule

Standings

Notes

References

External links
 Team Website

Major League Lacrosse seasons
New York Lizards